Jervois is a town in South Australia, on the right (western) bank of the lower Murray River. At the 2006 census, Jervois and the surrounding area had a population of 283. Jervois is predominantly a farming community, especially dairy farming on the floodplain and gently rising ground behind it.

In contrast to Jervois, Tailem Bend is high on cliffs above the left bank of the river. Jervois was surveyed in 1927 and named after the governor of South Australia, William Jervois.

See also
 List of cities and towns in South Australia
 List of crossings of the Murray River

References

Towns in South Australia